Peoples' Global Action (PGA) was the name of a worldwide co-ordination of radical social movements, grassroots campaigns and direct actions in resistance to capitalism and for social and environmental justice. PGA was part of the anti-globalization movement.

History 
The initial inspiration for the formation of PGA came from a global meeting called in 1996 by the Zapatista Army of National Liberation (EZLN), which had started a grassroots uprising in the impoverished Mexican state of Chiapas on New Year's Day 1994 when the North American Free Trade Agreement (NAFTA) came into effect.

The Zapatistas sent out an email calling for a gathering, called an 'encuentro' (encounter), of international grassroots movements to meet in specially constructed arenas in the Chiapas jungle to discuss common tactics, problems and solutions. Six thousand people attended, from over 40 countries, and declared that they would form "a collective network of all our particular struggles and resistances... an intercontinental network of resistance against neoliberalism... (and) for humanity".

In August 1997, the European Zapatista support network called for a Second 'Encuentro' in Spain, which it had planned with the Zapatistas during the 1996 encuentro. Delegates came again of movements from around the world, such as the Brazilian Landless Workers' Movement (MST) who occupies unused land to create farms, and the other Karnataka Rajya Raitha Sangha-KRRS (Karnataka State Farmers Association) from India, renowned for their "cremate Monsanto" campaign, which involved burning fields of genetically modified crops. Here some of the primary objectives and organisational principles of the emerging network were drafted.

In February 1998, movements from all continents met again, this time in Geneva, where Peoples' Global Action was launched.

Global actions 
So far, PGA's major function has been to serve as a political space for coordinating decentralised Global Action Days around the world, to highlight the global resistance of popular movements to capitalist globalisation. The first Global Action Days, during the 2nd WTO ministerial conference in Geneva in May 1998, involved tens of thousands of people in more than 60 demonstrations and street parties on five continents.
 Geneva 1998

Subsequent Global Action Days have included the Carnival Against Capital (June 18, 1999), the 3rd World Trade Organization summit in Seattle, USA (November 30, 1999), the International Monetary Fund / World Bank meeting in Prague, Czech Republic (September 26, 2000), the G8 meeting in Genoa, Italy (June 21, 2000) the 4th WTO summit in Qatar (November 9, 2001), etc.
 Prague 2000
 Calendar of actions

Decentralised mobilisations have been accompanied by strong central demonstrations. From the first mobilisation in Geneva, direct action was taken to block the summits, as this was considered the only form of action that could adequately express the necessity, not to reform, but to destroy the instruments of capitalist domination.

Groups involved in PGA have also organised Caravans, regional conferences, workshops and other events in many regions of the world. Since Geneva, Global PGA conferences have been held before WTO ministerials: in Bangalore, India (1999), and in Cochabamba, Bolivia (2001).

Activists from groups and grassroots organisations within the PGA network participated in the Zapatista encounter in Oventic, Chiapas at the end of 2006/ beginning of 2007, planning another Intercontinental Encounter for Summer 2007.

European Conference in 2008
A Peoples' Global Action gathering in Europe took place from August 19 to September 3, in France, in a decentralised fashion in 2006. The first nine days were distributed over five sites, each with specific themes, while the last five days took place in a central location, the autonomous space « Les Tanneries » in Dijon.
The PGA is planning another European Conference in August 2008 in Northern Greece. This is already being used by Alex Foti to promote a eurocentric ideology: "Our political space is Europe", although this has been resisted by other factions.

PGA, left-right convergence and racism
During the preparation for the anti-World Trade Organization (WTO) conference in Seattle in 1999 organised two action caravans, one from across the U.S., including activists from Chiapas, Mexico, the other from Canada. The later ended at the congress organised by International Forum on Globalisation, described by De Fabel van de illegaal as a right-wing elite think tank, which wants the Left and the Right to work together in one big movement. Mike Dolan, who worked for Ralph Nader's Public Citizen consumer watchdog group, was a substantial donor to and activist with the PGA. He called for support of the right-wing presidential candidate Pat Buchanan. Dolan sent around a newspaper article in which Buchanan openly says: "American workers and people first." When Dolan's actions and viewpoint were criticised from the grassroots level, Michael Morrill, the coordinator of the American PGA caravan, immediately took his side. "Let's work together when we can, work in parallel when we must, but never work against each other when our goal is the elimination of the WTO and its corporate benefactors." This took place alongside a general reluctance of people of color to participate in the Seattle mobilisation. 	 
	
In 2001, Raj Patel and Kala Subbuswamy discussed the problem of groups like the PGA in dealing with issues of race:

The principles of decentralisation and autonomy adopted by many within radical movements can also, unintentionally and remediably, be exclusionary. Many radical groups have anarchist principles behind them - non-hierarchical, consensus decision-making, often no formal structure. One problem with this is that it is often used to dismiss talk of what 'the movement' can do about issues of race and gender, on the grounds that we're not a movement, we're a collection of individuals and so we can't make decisions about the 'movement'. But UK EF!, or Peoples' Global Action, for example *are* movements, or at least networks with informal hierarchies and structures and unwritten rules. Every action involves a decision and a choice and it is important that these are open. For example, saying that we cannot exclude fascists from gatherings involves a choice - if people are allowed to say overtly racist comments, you exclude people of color, or at least prevent any chance of us feeling comfortable. This why at its last conference made explicit moves to overtly condemn discrimination
		
In 2002, Maria Theresa Santana, Chairperson of Moyo wa Taifa (UK) - Pan-Afrikan Women's Association attended the European PGA Conference in Leiden and expressed her anger at the Eurocentric standpoint of the PGA discussions.

At the PGA regional conference in Panama (August 2003), further concerns were raised that despite anti-hierarchical intentions, a leadership was emerging which only occasionally "got down the informations to their bases", that decisions were being made by meetings in Europe "that Europeans were imposing their political reality and way to work", and that prominent activists were promoting sexist attitudes rooted in religious fundamentalism.

Despite these discussions the 2004 European PGA conference in Jajinci, Belgrade agreed that "a fascist coming as an interested individual, respecting the hallmarks and whose behaviour during the conference was fine wouldn't be a problem.". Although a rider was subsequently added, this controversy has been further fuelled by the sympathies held by Leonid Savin (the co-ordinator of the Ukraine PGA info-point) with politics of Alexander Dugin. After Savin was shown to be an activist associated with the Eurasia Party, the PGA Ukraine info-point was removed from the PGA website. See also National anarchism.

Nevertheless, some elements within the PGA have been promoting No Borders initiatives.

See also 
Carnival Against Capitalism
Reclaim the Streets

References

External links 
PGA encounters in Europe
Peoples' Global Action website
MP3 Account of the formation of the PGA
Breaking the Silence Archives, Gender discussion preparations for 3rd European Peoples Global Action Conference, Jajinci 2004
PGA Europe Process Archives 2004
"The Invisible Network," by Mayo Fuster Morell, Mute, 13 July 2004

Anti-globalization organizations
Criticism of capitalism
Direct action
Environmental justice organizations
Organizations established in 1998
Social movements